Matlala Keletso Makgalwa (born 3 January 1997) is a South African soccer player who plays as a midfielder for TS Galaxy on loan from Mamelodi Sundowns.

Career
Magkalwa plays for Mamelodi Sundowns and has had a loan spell at Maritzburg United.

Honours
Mamelodi Sundowns
South African Premier Division: 2017–18, 2019–20
Nedbank Cup: 2019–20
Telkom Knockout: 2019
Source:

References

1997 births
Living people
South African soccer players
Association football midfielders
Mamelodi Sundowns F.C. players
Maritzburg United F.C. players
Moroka Swallows F.C. players
TS Galaxy F.C. players
South African Premier Division players